Mikee W. Goodman is a British singer, best known for being one of the two vocalists of the progressive metal band SikTh. He made an album in 2012 titled Awoken Broken under the project Primal Rock Rebellion, with Iron Maiden guitarist Adrian Smith.

Career
Goodman performed as a guest vocalist for Bat for Lashes, Cyclamen, Deathember, This Is Menace and Periphery. He has also been a member of the bands Outside The Coma (formerly Outpatients), The Painted Smiles and Sad Season.

In 2002, he wrote and directed a music video for the SikTh song "How May I Help You?", which was awarded best video of 2003 in Big Cheese Magazine. The video appeared on Scuzz MTV2 UK and MTV Asia. He has since directed other music videos which are accessible on Vimeo.

In 2017, he started work for the video game company ZA/UM on Disco Elysium, which was released in October 2019, as a voice actor for several characters. Following his work on the game, he started his own agency called Charactoon Voices.

Discography

With SikTh
 Let the Transmitting Begin (EP) (2002)
 How May I Help You? (EP) (2002)
 The Trees Are Dead & Dried Out Wait for Something Wild (2003)
 Scent of the Obscene (Single) (2003)
 Death of a Dead Day (2006)
 Flogging the Horses (EP) (2006)
  Opacities  (EP) (2015)
  The Future in Whose Eyes? (2017)

With Primal Rock Rebellion
Awoken Broken (2012)

Guest appearances
 This Is Menace, "No End In Sight" (2005)
 Bat for Lashes, "Fur and Gold" (2006)
 This Is Menace, "The Scene is Dead" (2007)
 Cyclamen, "Sleep Street" (2008)
 Deathember, "The Linear Act" (2011)
 Umpfel, "Fly Fly" (2015)
 Periphery, "Reptile" (2019)
 Red Method, "The Absent" (2019)
 Pitchshifter, "Un-United_Kingdom" (2020)

References

External links
 Mikee Goodman Official Website

English heavy metal singers
Year of birth missing (living people)
Living people